Nakkna is a Swedish fashion label based in Stockholm, Sweden.

Founded in 2003. Nakkna is known for its avant-garde, yet commercial, designs where complex constructions and draping are manifested in clean shapes without unnecessary embellishment. Nakkna is sold in fashion stores through Europe and selected cities in Asia and USA. Nakkna is run by designers Camilla Sundin, Claes Berkes and Ella Soccorsi, who all met at Beckmans School of Design in Stockholm, which they graduated from in 2001 in fashion design.

Awards
2004 Designer of the Year from Nöjesguiden Magazine
2004 the Hero Award from national newspaper Dagens Nyheter
2003 Elle Magazine Best Newcomer Award

They were also nominated for the Future Design Award in 2004

Other projects and collaborations
Absolut Vodka commissioned Nakkna to design cocktail glasses. for them and they also designed a Limited editions bag for Sony PSP

The Swedish Postal stamps collection released in August 2007 also futures Nakkna as one of the new breed of Swedish Design Labels.

External links
 Nakkna's Website

References

Clothing brands
Clothing brands of Sweden
Clothing brands of Stockholm
Clothing companies of Sweden